St. Michael's High School is a private Catholic junior/senior high school located in Santa Fe, New Mexico.  It is privately run under the auspices of the international Institute of the Brothers of the Christian Schools, better known as the De La Salle Christian Brothers.

St. Michael's teaches grades 7 through 12 and has an enrollment of approximately 450 students. The school has a president/principal structure and is overseen by a board of trustees. The school operates on a semester schedule.

History
St. Michael's High School was founded in 1859 as El Colegio de San Miguel in an adobe hut next to the San Miguel Mission on present-day Old Santa Fe Trail (formerly College Street), in what is now the Barrio De Analco Historic District. The school was established at the behest of Archbishop Jean-Baptiste Lamy, who had arrived in New Mexico in 1851 to find that formal education in the territory was almost nonexistent. After establishing the Loretto Academy for girls in 1852, Lamy recruited four De La Salle Christian Brothers from his native France to open a similar school for boys. Brothers Hilarien, Gondulph, Geramius and Galmier Joseph arrived on October 27, 1859, after two and a half months of travel by ship, train and covered wagon, and St. Michael's held its first classes shortly afterward.

In 1870, the school nearly closed due to financial hardship and falling morale of the Brothers and students. Brother Peter J. Schneider, known as Brother Botulph, arrived to open a novitiate to train local student Brothers and recruit more Brothers to Santa Fe. Under Botulph, St. Michael's began offering high school diplomas, and later, teaching certificates. In 1874, the territorial legislature granted the school a charter as the College of the Christian Brothers of New Mexico. In 1876, St. Michael's conferred diplomas on its first graduates. In 1877, Brother Botulph started a fundraising campaign to construct the school's first permanent building, which still exists in modified form as the Lamy Building. Ground was broken on the building in April 1878 and it was ready for classes by November. In 1887 the school completed a second building, now known as the Lew Wallace Building.

In the early decades of the twentieth century, the St. Michael's science labs were remodeled, a gymnasium, financed by alumni donations, was constructed, and athletic teams began competing in New Mexico's interscholastic sports program. After World War I, the college phased out its post-secondary courses but continued to operate as a high school, while a new St. Michael's College was established at a separate campus in 1947. In 1926, a fire destroyed the wood-framed third story of the main building, which was then truncated at the second floor and used as a dormitory. To make up for the loss of space, a new building, Chavez Memorial Hall, was added in 1927.

In 1968 St. Michael's moved to its current location at 100 Siringo Road and became co-educational upon the closing of the Loretto Academy for Girls. It also became exclusively a day school; previously the high school took on boarders from New Mexico and other states. The original campus was sold to the State of New Mexico, which turned the two older buildings into government offices and demolished the other campus structures.

Since 1967 there has been a gradual but steady increase in the number of lay teachers at St. Michael's, as the Brothers grow older and retire. In 1988, St. Michael's admitted its first lay person to the board of trustees and soon after hired its first lay, and first female, principal.

In 1957, students at St. Michael's helped tear down old barracks at Los Alamos, and moved them to the then St. Michael's College (now College of Santa Fe).  A large number of students participated in this on weekends.

St. Michael's used the road system at St. Michael's College, which had been an Army Hospital during World War II, for drivers training for their students

In the 1950s, it was very popular for St. Michael's boarding students to investigate the old New Mexico State Prison.  Sitting in the Electric Chair was always popular.  School dances were regularly held with the students of Loretto Academy.  The BIG football rivalry was St. Michael's against Santa Fe High School. Students regularly went ice skating at a reservoir near Las Vegas, NM.  These things were all experienced by Lynton "Bill" Sterwart, while a student at St. Michael's in 1957–1958.

Facilities
The school's campus covers 25 acres, and includes two gymnasiums, athletics fields, and other facilities. St. Michael's is the owner of the San Miguel Mission, reputed to be the oldest church west of the Mississippi River, as well as the "Oldest House" across the alleyway, said to be the remnants of an Indian pueblo.

Athletics

St. Michael's athletic nickname is the Horsemen. The school has won over 70 State Championships from NMAA sanctioned sports and events. St. Michael's competes in  District 2AAA, along with Raton High School, Robertson High School, Santa Fe Indian School, Santa Fe Preparatory School and West Las Vegas High School.

Notable alumni 
 Ron Porterfield (1983), MLB athletic trainer
 Tom Ford, Fashion Designer and Film Director
 Marjorie Herrera Lewis, author
 Michelle Lujan Grisham, Governor of New Mexico
 Ally Walker (1979), Actress

Notable faculty
 John Hamman

References

External links
 

Buildings and structures in Santa Fe, New Mexico
Educational institutions established in 1859
Lasallian schools in the United States
Catholic secondary schools in New Mexico
Schools in Santa Fe County, New Mexico
1859 establishments in New Mexico Territory